Catherine Apalat (born 28 August 1981) is a Ugandan journalist, blogger, filmmaker and still photographer at Uganda Media Women's Association (UMWA). As of April 2013, Apalat is the Programs Manager Mama FM, a community radio station under UMWA.

Background and education 
Apalat was born in Tororo to David Livingstone Ongadi a Primary School Teacher and Grace Onyadi  a Communication Specialist. Apalat attended Rock View for her primary school in 1994 before joining Tororo Girls and Our Lady of Gayaza for her secondary school (1995-2000). Apalat enrolled at Makerere University and graduated with a bachelor's degree in Mass Communication in 2005.

Career 
Apalat worked with Makerere University Mass Communication Film Department in 2002. Apalat produced a ten (10) minutes drama skit and entitled "Salongo’s Gift" and "Portrait of an artist". Apalat joined Top Radio and worked with News Production Department,  producing news, editing and specialized in crime reporting in 2003. Apalat joined the Great Lakes Film Production in 2005-2006 where she worked as a script writer and continuity film crew.

From 2007 to-date, Apalat is also worked as a producer and photographer for still photography  with Uganda Media Women's Association Newspaper pull out (The Other Voice) and Grass Root Women Empowerment Network (GWEN) Magazine among others. Apalat worked as an Fredskorpset (FK) Exchange Participant (Norwegian Peace Corp) with College of Journalism and Mass Communication (CJMC FM) in 2011, Nepal. The Nepali Ministry of Communication, Nepal recognized Apalat's contribution in showcasing the different African traditions and culture through films in the first ever Nepal Africa film festival in May 2011.

As of April 2013, Apalat is the Program's Director Mama Fm, a Community Radio Station in Uganda. Apalat worked with radio staff to ensure that radio's mission is adhered too producing gender focused programs, spot messages and drama skits.

Research 
Apalat has participated in a number of research projects including “Grass roots Women in Technology in 2013, Audience analysis for Mama FM listeners in 2014 and The Global Media Monitoring Project (GMMP) in 2015 with Uganda Media Women's Association.

References 

Ugandan journalists
1981 births
Living people
Ugandan bloggers
Ugandan women bloggers
Ugandan film producers
Ugandan photographers
Ugandan women photographers
People from Tororo District
Makerere University alumni
Ugandan women journalists